Jessica Smyth, known by the stage name Biig Piig is an Irish singer and rapper, based in West London. She performs in English and Spanish and is signed to Sony Music Entertainment.

Early life
Biig Piig was born in Cork, Ireland. She lived in Spain from the age of four to twelve, after her family had moved on advice that the climate would be better for her brother's asthma. Upon moving with her family back to Ireland, she was at first able to read and write only in Spanish, and had to reintegrate into Irish culture. She moved with her family to West London at the age of 14 where she worked as a late-night poker dealer, and where her parents continue to run a pub. While taking a music technology class at Richmond College, Biig Piig met Lava La Rue, the founder and creative director of NiNE8, a collective of like-minded young DIY musical artists. Biig Piig subsequently joined NiNE8, and during this period, performed at Soho open mics, finding a new voice at a freestyling session in 2015. It was at this freestyling session where Biig Piig met Mac Wetha, with whom she began writing and who became a major producer for her.

Career
In 2016 Biig Piig began uploading her music to SoundCloud. In 2017 her single "Vice City" caught the attention of digital music platform COLORS, who invited her to record a live video session of the song at their Berlin studios. Released on 13 April, it was a breakthrough for her, and has been viewed over nine million times on YouTube and streamed more than seven million times on Spotify. She followed it up with the singles "24K" and "Perdida". The latter gained her further notice. 

On 27 April 2018 she released the first of a trilogy of projects, the five-track EP Big Fan of the Sesh, Vol 1. Its sequel, A World Without Snooze, Vol 2, followed on 22 March 2019. In June of that year she signed to RCA Records, releasing the track "Roses and Gold" 2 October 2019 in advance of a headlining European tour and her first official label release "Sunny", produced by Zach Nahome.

The third in her trilogy, No Place For Patience, Vol. 3, her first EP on RCA, was released in November 2019 followed by latest EP release The Sky Is Bleeding in 2020, following a string of breakthrough singles including Switch,Don't Turn Around and  Feels Right with combined streams of over 60 million. 

Biig Piig opened for Glass Animals on their Dreamland tour in November 2021.

The single "Fun" was released on 14 June 2022. Biig Piig features on the single "Rainbow Tables" by Bien Et Toi, released August 2022.

In September she issued the single "Kerosene", co-written with Zach Nahome and Maverick Sabre.

Stage name
Biig Piig has explained that the name "puts no pressure on me to be a certain way – I can be a mess, and I can also be cute and put together."

Discography

Mixtapes

Extended plays

Singles

References

1998 births
Living people
21st-century Irish singers
21st-century Irish women singers
Irish rappers
Irish women rappers
Hip hop singers
Irish expatriates in Spain
Irish expatriates in England